Swiss cheese may refer to:

Cheese
 Swiss cheeses and dairy products (from Switzerland)
List of Swiss cheeses
 Swiss-type cheeses or Alpine cheeses, a class of cooked pressed cheeses now made in many countries
 Swiss cheese (North America), any of several related varieties of cheese that resemble Emmentaler

Biology
Swiss cheese cartilage dysplasia or Kniest dysplasia, a form of dwarfism
Swiss cheese plant (disambiguation)

Mathematics and physics
 Swiss cheese (mathematics), subset of the complex plane with circular holes
 Swiss cheese features, pits in the south polar ice cap of Mars
 Swiss cheese model, of accident causation, used in risk analysis and risk management

See also
Swiss Cheese Union, Swiss marketing body, up to 1999